The 2025 IHF World Men's Handball Championship, will be the 29th event hosted by the International Handball Federation. It will be held in Croatia, Denmark and Norway from 8 to 26 January 2025.

Denmark are the triple defending World Champions, having won the 2019, 2021 and 2023 edition.

Bidding process
Five nations expressed interest in hosting the tournament. The awarding of the event took place at the IHF Council meeting in Cairo, Egypt on 28 February 2020. Croatia, Denmark and Norway were chosen as the hosts. This will be the second time Croatia will host the World Men's Handball Championship, the third for Denmark, and the first for Norway.

//

Venues
The tournament is expected to take place in 11 cities: Zagreb, Split, Varaždin, Poreč and Dubrovnik in Croatia, Copenhagen and Herning in Denmark and Trondheim, Stavanger, Drammen and Oslo in Norway. The opening and final will take place in Oslo.

Qualification 
Qualification system will still depend on number of compulsory and performance places, as for 2023 World Championship. The World Championship hosts will be directly qualified, along with the reigning world champions.
Since there are three organisers, all from Europe, the number of compulsory places for Europe is reduced by two: 2 instead of default 4. The number of compulsory places awarded to other continental confederation keeps unchanged and is divided as follows: four places each for Asia and Africa, three places for the South and Central America Zone and one place for the North America and Caribbean Zone.
One additional place is available for Oceania, but only when that region's national team ranks fifth or higher at the Asian Championship. If no Oceania team places among the top five at the Asian Championship, the IHF will award an additional wild card.
In addition, there will be 12 performance places for the continental confederations, which are based on the teams ranked 1–12 in the preceding World Championship.
According to the new qualification system and taking into consideration the results of the 2023 Men's World Championship, the 32 places are distributed as follows:

1All hosting federations are automatically entitled to take part in the World Championship. If there is more than one organiser from the same Continental Confederation, the number of compulsory places of the respective Continental Confederation shall be reduced accordingly. If there is more than one organiser and the organisers are not from the same Continental Confederation, the IHF Council shall decide about the reduction of the compulsory places, considering only the compulsory places of the Continental Confederations involved.
2The reigning World Champion automatically qualifies for the next World Championship and, as a rule, is placed first in the first performance row. In case the reigning World Champion is also hosting the next World Championship, the Continental Confederation of the reigning World Champion obtains one additional performance place.
3The compulsory place for Oceania is subject to fulfilling certain conditions. The Continental Confederation of Oceania does not have a direct compulsory place for a Continental Confederation qualification event. The Continental Confederation of Oceania is invited to participate in the Asian qualification events. The compulsory place is awarded to Oceania if the representative from Oceania is ranked 5th or higher in the Asian qualification. If Oceania fails to rank 5th or does not participate, the IHF Council will award this place as a free wild card.
4The wild card shall be awarded by the IHF Council.

1. If countries from Oceania (Australia or New Zealand) participating in the Asian Championships finish within the top 5, they will qualify for the World Championships. If they finish placed sixth or lower, the place would have been transferred to the Wild Card spot.

2. To bear in mind the 2028 Summer Olympics, the IHF Council awarded the United States with wild cards for the 2025 and 2027 World Championships.

Qualified teams

1 Bold indicates champion for that year. Italic indicates host country for that year.

Seeding 
Following ranking of previous World Championship, and following IHF rules.

External links
Bidding committee website
IHF website

References

2025 Men
World Men's Handball Championship
International handball competitions hosted by Croatia
International handball competitions hosted by Denmark
International handball competitions hosted by Norway
World Men's